Jim Hustwit (born 29 September 1979) is an English music producer, composer and songwriter.

Scoring and producing music for singer-songwriters, television, film and theatre. he has written and produced music for Universal Production Music, Sony/ATV and Ninja Tune. His work with artists includes genres of soul, folk, acoustic, indie, funk and alternative and in 2010 he received The People's Music Award.  He is a member of the Music Producers Guild.

Career

Music producer 
Hustwit started writing production music for Sony/ATV in 2012. He has since produced for Universal Music (including the Filmic Folk series), Ninja Tune, WestOne and BMG. In 2018, Hustwit set up his own record label Larp Records a subsidiary of Larp Music, through which to launch artists Callum McIntyre and Jay Copper.

Theatre and stage 
Working with the National Theatre, he worked as musical director for the Olivier nominated This House (2013) alongside Oscar winner Stephen Warbeck. He later went on to compose the music for 'Consensual' by Evan Placey Macbeth (2014) with the National Youth Theatre, and was the associate musical director for Rupert Goold's production of Merchant of Venice (2014) at the Almeida Theatre.

Television and film 
His TV work includes the score for the BBC1 documentary The Week The Landlords Moved In (2017), and Yonderland 3 Christmas Special (2016) on Sky One. Other commissions include the score for Lucky Chicken (2016) a silent comedy directed by Gulliver Moore,  The Newboy (2014) feature film directed by Christine Lalla and compositions for Channel 4's award-winning One Born Every Minute with Dragonfly TV and Film Productions.
Other commissions include Talkback, Firecracker and Shine for programming on BBC1, BBC3 and Channel 4.

Stage productions 
Merchant of Venice; Almeida Theatre. (2014)
Macbeth; National Youth Theatre. (2014)
This House; National Theatre. (2013)

Film and television 
The Week the Landlords Moved In BBC1 (2017) 
Lucky Chicken Sheriff's Office Films (2016) 
Unsafe Sex and the City Series 2. Firecracker: BBC 3 (2014)
One Born: Plus Size Mums  Dragonfly: Channel 4 (2013)
One Born: Twins and Triplets  Dragonfly: Channel 4. (2013)
Fanny and Friends Fremantle Media: Channel 4 (2012)
Strictly Baby Disco  Boundless: Channel 4 (2012)

References

Living people
English composers
English songwriters
1979 births